Rick Miller (born March 12, 1970) is a Canadian director, actor, comedian, musician and playwright, currently living in Toronto. He has two architecture degrees from McGill University in Montreal, and has performed in 5 languages on 5 continents. Although primarily known as a solo theatre creator and performer, Miller is also known for hosting the television series Just for Laughs and for performing a version of "Bohemian Rhapsody" during which he impersonates "twenty five of the most annoying voices in the music industry". His solo show BOOM was the most presented play in Canada in 2015–16, and will be playing in Europe and the United States in 2019–20. The GenX sequel to BOOM - BOOM X - premiered in January 2019 and is now on tour across Canada.

Career
Miller has created and performed in many plays, BOOM, BOOM X, Bigger than Jesus, MacHomer, HARDSELL 2.0 - VENDU, and Robert Lepage's Lipsync.

In an example of art imitating life imitating art, The Simpsons featured a segment in the episode "Four Great Women and a Manicure", in which Homer and Marge played versions of Macbeth and Lady Macbeth, respectively. This was an idea originally conceived by Miller for his one-man-show MacHomer. Matt Groening approved of the show and allowed Miller to use his characters.

Miller is also the co-creative director of the Kidoons Network, the Canadian multimedia company that has developed the family touring stage shows Twenty Thousand Leagues Under The Sea (premiere in 2015), Jungle Book (premiere in 2018), and the forthcoming Frankenstein. Kidoons also produces web series for families, featuring animated characters that connect to the Kidoons stage shows.

When not on tour, Miller is the frontman for the Toronto party band TRAINWRECK, also featuring his life partner of 25 years, Stephanie Baptist. In 2019, he released a compilation CD of 20 tracks from all of his solo shows called Rick Miller SONGS (from BOOM X and Other Shows).

Bohemian Rhapsody skit 
Miller is best known for his famous portrayal of the Queen song "Bohemian Rhapsody" "as performed by 25 of the most annoying voices in the music industry". However, the actual number of parodies in the sketch is 27, including a general parody of lead guitarists. A video of the performance was uploaded on YouTube in 2007, and has been seen over 1,000,000 times. The list of parodies includes (in order): Bob Dylan, Neil Young, Michael Bolton, Corey Hart, Willie Nelson, Johnny Cash, Jon Bon Jovi, Robbie Robertson, Neil Diamond, Aaron Neville, Dennis DeYoung, Barney the Dinosaur, Aerosmith, "Any Annoying Lead Guitarist", Meat Loaf, Crash Test Dummies, Tom Petty, Beck, The B-52's, AC/DC, Metallica, The Rolling Stones, Ozzy Osbourne, Julio Iglesias, Bobby McFerrin, Andrea Bocelli, and Guns N' Roses.

Voice work 
Miller has also worked as a voice actor for numerous animated television shows and a video game.

Some of the characters he has voiced include:
The Dark Prince in Prince of Persia: The Two Thrones (Video Game)
Winston Churchill in Assassin's Creed: Syndicate (Video Game)
Principal Shawbly in Mona the Vampire
Sparky in Atomic Betty
Ben and Fen in Cyberchase
Mr. Fisher in Odd Job Jack
Sydney and Captain Minus in Turtle Island
Bongo in My Big Big Friend
Orwin, Ashio and Freep in Magi-Nation
Semuru - Evolution DC in Far Cry Instincts (Video Game)
Snaily in The Twins
Tiger in George of the Jungle
Hedley Diddly Dee in Skatoony
Narrator, Colonel Weston and Doctor in Canadian Made
Acorn Trooper (M) and Sauly in Get Squirrely
David Sarif in Deus Ex: Mankind Divided (Video Game)
Tite-Gripp in Atomic Puppet
Various Characters in Arthur, Ripley's Believe It or Not!, Scaredy Squirrel and Busytown Mysteries

References

External links

MacHomer official site
Bigger than Jesus official site
Rick Miller performing "Bohemian Rhapsody"
BOOM and BOOM X official site
Kidoons official site
Twenty Thousand Leagues Under The Sea official site
Jungle Book official site
Frankenstein official site
TRAINWRECK official site

Living people
Canadian comedy musicians
Canadian stand-up comedians
Canadian male voice actors
Comedians from Toronto
Dora Mavor Moore Award winners
Male actors from Toronto
Musicians from Toronto
Place of birth missing (living people)
1970 births
Canadian impressionists (entertainers)